Shooting sports at the 1974 Asian Games was held in Aryamehr Sport Complex Shooting Range, Tehran, Iran between 2 September 1974 and 7 September 1974.

Shooting comprised eleven individual and eleven team events, all open to both men and women. Each team could enter four shooters per event but only one score from each country counts in the individual competitions.

Medalists

Medal table

References 

 ISSF Results Overview
 New Straits Times, September 3–8, 1974
 The Straits Times, September 3–8, 1974

External links
Asian Shooting Federation

 
1974 Asian Games events
1974
Asian Games
1974 Asian Games